Straight to the Point is the second studio album by Atlantic Starr. Produced by  Bobby Eli, founding member and lead guitarist of Philadelphia studio group MFSB.

Track listing
 All songs written by Wayne Lewis, except as noted.

"(Let's) Rock & Roll" - 7:30
"Kissin' Power" (Bobby Eli, Jeff Prusan) - 6:23
"Let The Spirit Move Ya" (Bobby Eli, Jeff Prusan) - 5:08
"Straight To The Point" - 4:45
"Bullseye" (Bruce Grey, Bobby Eli, Jeff Prusan) - 3:15
"What'cha Feel Inside" (Bobby Eli, Jeff Prusan) - 3:39
"Fallin' In Love With You" - 3:29
"Losin' You" - 5:28

Personnel
Atlantic Starr
 Wayne Lewis – keyboards, backing vocals, lead vocals (1, 2, 4, 5, 6, 8), arrangements (1, 4, 7, 8), horn arrangements (5), vocal arrangements (5)
 David Lewis – guitars, backing vocals, lead vocals (5, 7), vocal arrangements (5)
 Clifford Archer – bass
 Porter Carroll, Jr. – drums, backing vocals, lead vocals (3, 5), vocal arrangements (5)
Sharon Bryant – percussion, backing vocals, lead vocals (1, 2, 3, 5, 8), vocal arrangements (5)
Joseph Phillips – percussion, congas, flute
 Damon Rentie – saxophones, flute
 Koran Daniels – alto saxophone solo (8) (not listed as an official member at this point)
 Jonathan Lewis – trombone, horn arrangements (6) 
 William Sudderth III – trumpetAdditional musicians
 Bobby Eli – guitar (2, 3, 5, 6), arrangements (2, 3, 5, 6), string arrangements (4, 7, 8), horn arrangements (6)
 Don Renaldo and The Philly Strings – strings (4, 7, 8)

Production
 Bobby Eli – producer 
 Jim Gallagher – engineer
 Carl Paruolo – engineer, mixing 
 Dirk Devlin – additional engineer
 Kenny Present – additional engineer
 Bruce Bluestein – assistant engineer
 Bill Dorman – assistant engineer
 Frank Luria – assistant engineer
 Jeffrey Stewart – assistant engineer
 Bernie Grundman – mastering at A&M Studios (Hollywood, California).
 Chuck Beeson – graphic design 
 Roland Young – art direction 
 Brian Davis – illustration 
 Brian Hagiwara – photography

Charts

Singles

References

External links
 Atlantic Starr-Straight To The Point at Discogs
 

1979 albums
A&M Records albums
Atlantic Starr albums
Albums recorded at Sigma Sound Studios